The Zone of Death is a 1917 silent French lost film directed by Abel Gance.

Cast
 Andrée Brabant
 Julien Clément (as Clément)
 Anthony Gildès
 Andrée Lionel
 Léon Mathot
 Gaston Modot
 Georges Paulais
 Paul Vermoyal

References

External links

1917 films
1910s French-language films
French silent feature films
French black-and-white films
Films directed by Abel Gance
1910s French films